Maya Hakvoort (born 19 September 1966 in Nijmegen) is a Dutch musical actress.

Maya Hakvoort studied singing at the conservatory of Maastricht and acting and dancing at the Kleinkunst-academy in Amsterdam, before she started gathering practical musical experience in the Netherlands, Germany, Austria and Belgium.

She debuted in the musical "Jeans" in 1989. After numerous minor and greater roles in "Chicago", Les Misérables and "Gaudí" she got her most famous role to date in 1994  in "Theater an der Wien" as Empress Elisabeth in the German-language musical Elisabeth in Vienna in 1994, replacing Pia Douwes.

Through playing the title role in Elisabeth she gained great recognition throughout Europe.
In 1999 she played Fantine in Les Misérables in Duisburg, Germany. Then she got the part of "Rose" in "Aspects of Love" in Bern, Switzerland.
As the Swiss didn't want to let her go, she played Milady de Winter in George Stiles "The Three Musketiers" in St Gallen.
Back in her homeland she toured with "There's no business like Showbusiness" before she went back to Vienna to play the role of Lisa in Frank Wildhorns "Jekyll and Hyde"
Ten months after giving birth to her first child she made a revival as "Elisabeth" in Theater an der Wien  2003

On New Year's Eve 2004  Hakvoort started touring  through Austria, Italy and Germany with her own solo tour: "Maya Goes Solo". 
After her last performance on 5 December 2005, she started in 2006 in Baden as "Evita",

In  the spring  of 2007  Hakvoort and some of her colleagues of the United Stages of Vienna went to Japan to perform the musical Elisabeth there. By now, she has already played the role of "Elisabeth" more than 1000 times.

On 12 October 2007 her new solo tour "In My Life" premiered in Vienna.

In 2008 the comedy Musical "High Society" as Tracy showed the audience that she had a comic talent.

In the beginning of 2009 "Lilly Vanessy" in Kiss me Kate in Vienna

After her second child, she was cast by entertainer/singer and producer Alfons Haider in  the summer of 2010 for the main role in "Victor/Victoria" in Stockerau .

In October 2010 she made her way again to St Gallen to play the evil "Mrs Danvers"  in  Daphne du Mauriers "Rebecca".

After her 3 Programm "Maya's musical Life" she wanted to be accompanied by a big band, so she created a new show, "This is my Life" with 10 Musicians.

In 2012 she went back to Japan, where she had her finishing night of "Elisabeth"

This year (2013) she produced "Voices of Musical" with Uwe Kröger, Pia Douwes, Lukas, Perman, Marjan Shaki, Ramesh Nair, Sophisticated Showdance Compagny, and The Rounder Girls.
And is having her Première in Mörbisch on 30 July 2013. Her 2 show on the 31 August in Bregenz

As the Voices of Musical Christmas will be played the winter of 2013  in Graz, Linz, Vienna and Bregenz

Discography
Elisabeth - live 1996
In Love with Musical - live 1996
Musical Christmas in Vienna 1996
Musicalstars singen Weihnachtslieder 1996
Ihr Männer 1997
Shades of Night 1997
That's Musical 1999
Musical Changes 2000
Duettalbum van Marco Bakker 2000
There's No Business Like Showbusiness - live 2000
Jekyll & Hyde - Wiener Productie 2002
10th Anniversary Concert Elisabeth 2002
Elisabeth (5 Tracks) 2003
Schlaraffenland 2003
Elisabeth - 2004
Musical Christmas in Vienna 2004
Maya Goes Solo - 2005
In My Life - 2008

References

External links 
Webpage

1966 births
Living people
Dutch women singers
Dutch musical theatre actresses
People from Nijmegen